Curculio sayi, the small chestnut weevil, is a species of true weevil in the family of beetles known as Curculionidae. It is found in North America.The distribution of this species extends from Canada and Massachusetts to North Carolina, Tennessee, and Ohio, and probably farther westward. The average length of the body is about 1/4" (6mm). 

Appearance of adults may vary from late in June to July, according to locality and season - growing degree days. Eggs are laid singly, but many may be placed in a single nut.  The larvae when hatched feed on the tissue of the growing kernels.

References

Further reading

External links

Curculioninae
Articles created by Qbugbot
Beetles described in 1836